Henri Frenay Sandoval (1905–1988) was a French military officer and French Resistance member.

Early life and education 
He was born in Lyon, France, on 11 November 1905, into a Catholic family with a military tradition. He studied the Germanic languages at the university of Strasbourg.

Military career 
He became a soldier like his father and studied in Saint Cyr and the École Supérieure de Guerre and reached the rank of captain in 1934. At the outbreak of World War II, he rejoined the French army. German forces captured him in Vosges. He arrived in Marseille after escaping from a POW camp in Alsace on 27 June 1940.

Resistance 
At first Frenay supported the Vichy Regime but was soon disillusioned by the Nazi tendency of the Pétain regime, and he subsequently formed the French Resistance group Mouvement de Libération Nationale in 1940. He became an editor of underground newspapers such as Vérités (Truths) and had a hand in the formation of the Combat group in November 1941. In 1943, his group participated in the forming of the Conseil National de la Résistance of Jean Moulin, but Frenay refused a seat since he disagreed over the admission of political parties to the Conseil.

When the Gestapo captured Moulin, Frenay fled to Algiers. In November 1943, he met Charles de Gaulle, who appointed him as a minister of prisoners, refugees and deportees.

Post war 
After the war, Frenay served in de Gaulle's first provisional government. He retired from the political life and became a businessman. He published his autobiography, The Night Will End: Memoirs of a Revolutionary in 1976 and criticised Moulin and de Gaulle as reckless.

Personal life 
Between 1934 and 1942, he had a passionate affair with Berty Albrecht, a Protestant, feminist and anti-fascist woman, twelve years his senior, who was separated from her husband. Albrecht was a martyr of the French Resistance and worked with Frenay on the underground newspapers. 

In 1942, he met Chilina Ciosi (1909-1997), head doctor of a clinic in Font-Romeu and head of a Resistance transit route to Spain. She gave birth to a child on 6 October 1943. To avoid endangering the mother and child, their son was declared "of unknown father and mother" and placed in a nursery until the end of the conflict. Frenay and Ciosi married after the war, on 25 November 1946.

Frenay died at Porto-Vecchio, Corsica, on 8 August 1988.

References

Sources

1905 births
1988 deaths
Military personnel from Lyon
Politicians from Auvergne-Rhône-Alpes
Democratic and Socialist Union of the Resistance politicians
French Section of the Workers' International politicians
Government ministers of France
French military personnel of World War II
French Resistance members